The Answer is the 53rd and penultimate book in the Animorphs series. It is the final book (fully) narrated by Jake and is the final book to fully be narrated by only one character.

Plot summary
After the destruction of the Yeerk pool, Jake, Tobias, and Marco hide while witnessing the Yeerks destroying the last remnants of their hometown and watch as the Pool Ship lands amidst the destruction. After briefly considering destroying the Pool Ship, the Animorphs hide, deciding that capturing the vessel would be a better strategy.

Hoping to gain military assistance for the attack, Jake visits Major General Sam Doubleday. Although Doubleday is initially distrustful of Jake, he eventually listens and agrees to Jake's plan after a Controller-major on the general's staff tries to kill Jake. After a Yeerk attack on the general's base, Doubleday evacuates his troops and confines them and himself for three days to eliminate any remaining Controllers amongst his soldiers.

Unfortunately, the confinement of Doubleday and his troops means a three-day delay before the Animorphs can launch their attack on the Pool Ship. Sensing that the Yeerks could get the new Yeerk pool that is under construction operational within that time period, the Animorphs decide to take out the Taxxons digging the pool. In the ensuing battle, Jake finds himself underground and in the company of several Taxxons, led by none other than Arbron, a former companion of Elfangor's who became a Taxxon-nothlit several years earlier. Arbron makes Jake an offer: in exchange for allowing his followers to become nothlits and make a home for themselves on Earth, the 1709 non-Controller Taxxons on the surface and on board the Pool Ship will defect and join the Animorphs in their fight against the Yeerks.

Jake returns to the Hork-Bajir valley and tells the others of Arbron's offer. The brief period of excitement that reigns through the camp is spoiled, however, when Ax, prompted by Cassie (who, as it turns out, has been privy to his prior communication with his people in the previous book by morphing into a flea and riding on his back whenever he snuck off to contact them), tells the others that the Andalites have decided that the war for Earth is lost and are planning on destroying humanity in order to stop the Yeerk menace once and for all. Jake, Rachel, Tobias, and Marco are all furious and feel betrayed by Ax for not telling them about this, and they realize that the Andalites have gone from their allies to their enemies.  Ax insists that the only way to stop this is to capture the Pool Ship and use its communications technology to contact the Andalite people directly, whom he does not expect to support his government's sterilization plan.

The Animorphs return to Arbron and his Taxxon followers and secure their support. Jake promises the Taxxons a safe haven on Earth and the opportunity to morph anacondas. Immediately afterwards, Tom arrives and offers to assist the Animorphs in capturing the Pool ship, in exchange for the Blade Ship, a hundred of his own morph-capable followers, and safe passage out of the Solar System. Sensing a trap, Jake  accepts Tom's offer while simultaneously setting his own plan into motion. Jake dispatches Marco to locate Erek King and bring him to the Hork-Bajir valley, while Cassie and Ax are sent to capture Chapman. Jake manipulates Erek's pacifist programming by threatening to kill Chapman if Erek does not actively participate in the assault on the Pool Ship. Erek grudgingly agrees to help.

With the attack set to begin, Jake meets up with Tom and the original Animorphs, including a severely beaten Cassie, and proceeds to board the Pool Ship. Once on board, Tom, as expected, betrays Jake by having a Taxxon eat Cassie and the other Animorphs, whom he believes to be hiding on Cassie in morph. Unknown to Tom, "Cassie" is actually a holographic projection by Erek, and the Taxxon is Tobias in morph, escorted by free Hork-Bajir led by Toby Hamee. After devouring the hologram, Tobias and Erek, with the other Animorphs in tow, are led off the bridge by Toby so they can begin trying to gain control of the Pool Ship's computer systems. Visser One gives Tom command of the Blade Ship so he can wipe out the Taxxon resistance. Unbeknownst to the Yeerks and the Animorphs (save for Jake), Rachel is hiding as a flea on Tom's head, with orders to kill him and prevent the Blade Ship from escaping with the morphing cube, an assignment that Rachel is not expected to survive.

The Auxiliary Animorphs and General Doubleday's forces begin their attack on the Pool Ship. Visser One lifts the ship off the ground and uses its massive weapons array to kill the Auxiliary Animorphs and several of Doubleday's troops. Jake, who is still on the bridge, is forced to watch the massacre until Ax and Erek are able to gain control of the helm and force the Pool Ship out of firing range. This act makes Visser One realize that the Animorphs have infiltrated the Pool Ship's engineering section and orders his troops to kill everyone in the room. Jake meets up with the others, who escaped the engine room before Visser One's forces could carry out their orders, and tells them of Rachel's part in his plan. The Animorphs continue with their assault and make their way to the Pool Ship's on-board Yeerk pool. Hoping to distract Visser One and Tom long enough to save Rachel's life, Jake orders Ax to flush the pool, killing 17,372 unhosted Yeerks. The Animorphs continue to the bridge, where they find a defeated and battle-weary Visser One. Jake asks the visser to fire on the Blade Ship with the hope that the shots will disable it, but the Dracon beams miss and Erek drains the remaining power from the weapons. Tom hails the Pool Ship to gloat about his victory, and sees Jake in tiger morph. Enraged at the realization that the Animorphs survived his trap, Tom orders the Blade Ship's weapons to be targeted at the Pool Ship's bridge.

Jake orders Rachel to attack.

Morphs

*All seventeen of the Auxiliary Animorphs participated in the final battle and thus were all in their combat morphs; they also used their flight morphs to arrive at the Hork-Bajir valley.

Animorphs books
2001 science fiction novels
2001 American novels